Peder Fredricson (born 30 January 1972) is a Swedish equestrian and Olympic medalist. He was born in Flen in Södermanland. He has won one Olympic gold medal in team jumping at the 2020 Summer Olympics in Tokyo, and three Olympic silver medals, his first in team jumping at the 2004 Summer Olympics in Athens, his second in individual jumping at the 2016 Summer Olympics in Rio de Janeiro, and his third in Individual jumping at the 2020 Summer Olympics in Tokyo. He also participated at the 1992 Summer Olympics in Barcelona, in eventing.  In 2021 Tokyo Olympic Games, Peder Fredricson with his horse H&M All In won team gold medal with Malin Baryard-Johnsson and Henrik von Eckermann and also a silver medal as individual. 
Among his top horses, there are H&M Christian K, H&M All In, Catch me Not S, Jumper d’Oase and Thelma Hästak.

References

External links

1972 births
Living people
People from Flen Municipality
Swedish male equestrians
Olympic equestrians of Sweden
Olympic gold medalists for Sweden
Olympic silver medalists for Sweden
Equestrians at the 1992 Summer Olympics
Equestrians at the 2004 Summer Olympics
Equestrians at the 2016 Summer Olympics
Equestrians at the 2020 Summer Olympics
Olympic medalists in equestrian
Medalists at the 2004 Summer Olympics
Medalists at the 2016 Summer Olympics
Medalists at the 2020 Summer Olympics
Sportspeople from Södermanland County
20th-century Swedish people
21st-century Swedish people